The 1997 Washington Huskies football team was an American football team that represented the University of Washington during the 1997 NCAA Division I-A football season.  In its fifth season under head coach Jim Lambright, the team compiled an 8–4 record, finished fourth in the Pacific-10 Conference, and outscored its opponents 420 to 259. Receiver Jerome Pathon was selected as the team's most valuable player. Seniors Pathon, Jerry Jensen, Rashaan Shehee, Tony Parrish were the team captains.

After a 27–0 shutout of USC on November 1, the Huskies were 7–1 and ranked sixth in the nation. Saddled with injuries, they lost the final three conference games to unranked Oregon, #9 UCLA, and #11 Washington State.

At the Aloha Bowl on Christmas Day against #25 Michigan State, Washington built a 31–10 lead at halftime and won 51–23; it was Lambright's sole bowl victory in his six seasons as head coach. The win moved UW up three spots in the final rankings, to #18 in both major polls.

Schedule

Roster

NFL Draft
Ten Huskies were selected in the 1998 NFL Draft, which lasted seven rounds (241 selections).

References

Washington
Washington Huskies football seasons
Aloha Bowl champion seasons
Washington Huskies football